Thibet cloth (Tibet cloth or Thibet) is a camlet made of goat's hair, originally from Tibet.

Structure 
Thibet cloth is a weave of goat's hair made by Tibetans in Asia. It is a heavy and coarse material. The cloth is normally used in local men's clothing. Thibet can also be "a fine woolen fabric formerly used for dresses" or a  fabric used for suits and coats and "finished with a soft smooth heavily-felted face".

Use 
The Thibet cloth was suitable for over-coats.

See also 
 Puttoo

References 

Woven fabrics
Animal hair products
Woolen clothing